Paul Northeast is a former Australian rules footballer for the Port Adelaide Football Club in the South Australian National Football League (SANFL). He won eight premierships during his career and won the clubs best and fairest in 1991.

References

Port Adelaide Football Club (SANFL) players
Port Adelaide Football Club players (all competitions)
Australian rules footballers from South Australia
Year of birth missing (living people)
Living people